Harold Howell Meredith "Drummer" Thomas (17 August 1883 – 10 February 1947) was a Welsh international forward who played club rugby for Swansea and Llanelli. He won just a single cap for Wales.

Personal history
Thomas was born in Swansea in 1883. He served in the Welch Regiment and after the first World War he moved to Haverfordwest. He died in 1947 in Bournemouth, England.

Rugby career
Thomas came to note as a rugby player when he joined Swansea. He spent just one season for Swansea before moving to local rivals Morriston RFC. He played just a few matches for Morriston, before being picked up by Llanelli RFC. It was while at Llanelli that Thomas was selected for Wales, playing France at Rodney Parade in Newport. Although Wales won the game, it was seen as far too close a match and eight members of the Welsh team played their last Five Nations Championship game. Thomas was one of the eight dropped and never represented Wales again.

International matches played
Wales
  1912

Bibliography

References

1883 births
1947 deaths
British Army personnel of World War I
Llanelli RFC players
Morriston RFC players
Rugby union fullbacks
Rugby union players from Swansea
Swansea RFC players
Wales international rugby union players
Welch Regiment soldiers
Welsh rugby union players